

Y40
The Y40 was a special water-cooled OHV V8 engine produced for the Nissan President Limousine between 1965 and 1973. It has 16 valves (two per cylinder) and a 4-barrel carburetor and 9.0:1 compression ratio.

This V8 engine was developed before the merger with Prince Motor Company and was not directly related to Prince's W64 V8, used exclusively in the Prince Royal limousine.

This engine was used in the following vehicle(s):

 1965-1973 Nissan President
 1965-1971 Nissan Cedric Patrol Y130 series

Y44
The Y44 is an OHV V8, 16 valve, 4 barrel down draught carb engine produced for the Nissan President and since 1975 used electronic fuel injection. In 1975, Nissan introduced its emission regulation technology called NAPS (Nissan Anti Pollution System).

This engine was used in the following vehicle(s):
 1974-1989 Nissan President

The Nissan Y engine was replaced in 1990 with the Nissan VH engine.

See also
 List of Nissan engines
 Nissan W64 engine
 Nissan President

Y
V8 engines

Gasoline engines by model